The Imam Bukhari Jamaat (also Katibat Imam al Bukhari) is an Islamist Salafi group fighting in the Syrian Civil War and the War in Afghanistan, composed of primarily Uzbeks, and expressing loyalty to the Taliban movement. The group originally operated only in Syria, where it is allied with other jihadist organisations such as al-Nusra Front and Ahrar ash-Sham, and alongside these other groups it makes up the Army of Conquest, which overran much of Idlib province in north Syria in 2015. Since late 2016, the group has also began to fight against Afghan National Security Forces, and has claimed to have set up training camps in northern Afghanistan.

The group is named after Imam Bukhari, a 9th-century Islamic scholar who was from Bukhara in modern-day Uzbekistan.

Leadership
The group was led by an individual known as Sheikh Salahuddin, before his assassination in Idlib Governorate.

Organization
The Syrian and Afghan branches of KIB have sworn allegiance to Mullah Akhundzada of the Taliban.

See also
 List of armed groups in the Syrian Civil War
 Foreign fighters in the Syrian and Iraqi Civil Wars

References

External links
http://buhoriy.com

Anti-government factions of the Syrian civil war
Jihadist groups in Syria
Organizations designated as terrorist by Iraq
Organizations designated as terrorist by Kyrgyzstan
Salafi Islamist groups
Organizations based in Asia designated as terrorist